John Milne (1850–1913) was a British geologist and mining engineer.

John Milne may also refer to:

Jack Milne (speedway rider) (1907–1995), speedway rider
Jackie Milne (1911–1959), Scottish international footballer (Arsenal, Middlesbrough)
John Milne (English footballer) (fl. 1888–1894), English footballer (Bolton Wanderers, Manchester City)
John Milne (journalist) (1942–2014), BBC Scotland presenter
John Milne (politician) (1839–1922), Canadian iron moulder, businessman and Senator
John M. Milne (1850–1905), head of the institution that is today State University of New York at Geneseo
John Theobald Milne (1895–1917), English fighter pilot and flying ace during the First World War
John Milne (British Army officer) (born 1946), British Army general
John Milne (architect) (1823–1904), Scottish architect
John Clark Milne (1897–1962), Scottish poet
John Milne (sculptor) (1931–1978), English abstract sculptor

See also
John Mylne (disambiguation)